Ibrahim Pasha-ogly Dadashov (10 April 1926 – 16 July 1990) was an Azerbaijani and Soviet featherweight freestyle wrestler. He competed for the Soviet Union at the 1952 Summer Olympics, but was eliminated after four bouts. Domestically he won the Soviet title in 1949, 1951, 1952 and 1956, placing second in 1954–55, and third in 1950. After retiring from competitions he worked as a wrestling coach. His trainees included Aydin Ibrahimov.

References

External links
 

1926 births
1990 deaths
Sportspeople from Baku
Honoured Masters of Sport of the USSR
Merited Coaches of the Soviet Union
Recipients of the Order of the Red Banner of Labour
Dynamo sports society athletes
Olympic wrestlers of the Soviet Union
Wrestlers at the 1952 Summer Olympics
Azerbaijani male sport wrestlers
Soviet male sport wrestlers

Burials at Alley of Honor
Burials at II Alley of Honor